State Route 37 (SR 37) is a  state highway in Dale County in the southeastern part of the U.S. state of Alabama. The southern terminus of the highway is at an intersection with US 84/SR 134 at Daleville and leads to the Tank Hill Gate of Fort Rucker, where the highway ends. SR 37 is routed along a two-lane undivided highway for its brief length.

Route description
SR 37 begins at an intersection with US 84/SR 12/SR 134 in Daleville, heading north on two-lane undivided Tank Hill Road through woodlands. The highway crosses CR 114 (Joe Bruer Road) before turning northeast through more woods and ending at the Tank Hill Gate of Fort Rucker.

History
The current SR 37 is the third incarnation of the route. In 1940, the original route was designated, heading from near Marvyn to near Oxford. In 1954, the section of the highway from Opelika northwards was redesignated as US 431 and rerouted SR 1. In 1960, SR 37 was extended southward, from Marvyn to Hurtsboro. That highway was replaced in 1985 when SR 51 was extended northward from Hurtsboro to what was then the northern terminus of SR 37 at its interchange with Interstate 85 (I-85). The second route went from Perdue Hill to Little River for a short time, but was gone by 1999, and is now CR 1. The present SR 37 was designated along its current route between 1997 and 1999.

Major intersections

See also

References

External links

037
Transportation in Dale County, Alabama
State highways in the United States shorter than one mile